The River Tame is a river in the West Midlands of England, and one of the principal tributaries of the River Trent.

It forms part of the Severn-Trent flyway, a route used by migratory birds to cross Great Britain.

Etymology 
The name derives from the Celtic language, although it may have even earlier roots. It is usually thought to mean "dark", by analogy with the Sanskrit word tamas meaning darkness. Other possibilities are "slow-moving" or "flowing", although the precise meaning is uncertain. The name is shared with the River Tame, Greater Manchester, and it is likely that the River Thame, the River Thames, the River Teme, the River Team, and the River Tamar all share the derivation.

Historic significance 
Birmingham and the parishes in the centre and north of the modern conurbation were probably colonised by the Tomsaete or Tomsæte ("Tame-dwellers"), an Anglian tribe living in the valley of the Tame and around Tamworth during the Kingdom of Mercia. They migrated up the valleys of the Trent and Tame from the Humber Estuary, and later formed Mercia.

Course and catchment
The Tame is generally considered to have two main sources; Willenhall and Oldbury. The tributaries arising in these locations are generally known as the Willenhall arm and the Oldbury arm of the Tame. However, some of its tributary streams, including Waddens Brook, rise as far to the west and north as Bilston and Wednesfield in the city of Wolverhampton. Much of the course of the river has been modified over the centuries, and the urban sections now run mainly through culverts or canalised channels. Both arms of the Tame flow through the Black Country to their confluence at Bescot, on the edge of Walsall.

The Willenhall or Wolverhampton arm
The northern arm is easily traced from Bentley, near Willenhall. However, the SMURF project traces it back as far as Stow Heath, near Bilston, where it is marked by a marshy patch at the northern end of the City of Wolverhampton College's Wellington Road campus; hence, SMURF uses the term "Wolverhampton arm" for this section of the Tame. Victorian Ordnance Survey maps trace the sources of the Tame further back, to the site of the old Stow Heath colliery, which is now Wolverhampton's East Park.

The stream runs invisibly but generally north-eastward through Stowlawn, and then cuts across the southern edge of Willenhall, appearing briefly among the warehouses, and picking up reinforcement from the Waddens Brook, which originates in Wednesfield. It appears definitively at Watery Lane and Noose Lane, even more so at Bentley, where it runs southward through the industrial part of Bentley, before turning south-eastward, following a realigned course alongside and beneath the M6 motorway, to Bescot.

The Oldbury arm
The southern arm appears prominently close to Oldbury town centre, which gives it its name, but can be traced back to an industrial area at Titford, just west of the M5 motorway, between Whiteheath and Langley Green. It winds its way up through Langley and around the southern and eastern edges of Oldbury town centre, surfacing due south of Sandwell & Dudley railway station, from which point it remains mainly on the surface and is easily traced. Bearing generally north-westward, it skirts Brades Village and flows into Tipton. Here it passes through Sheepwash Urban Park and Horseley Heath to the centre of Great Bridge. Leaving Tipton, it then zig-zags across the southern and eastern parts of Wednesbury, to meet the Willenhall or Wolverhampton arm at Bescot.

The Main Stream
The unified Tame then flows—partly through channels realigned to make way for the M6 motorway and its interchange with the M5—through Sandwell Valley and into north Birmingham. It passes through Hamstead and Perry Hall Park to Perry Barr, where it is crossed by the Perry Bridge of 1711, then through Witton and beneath both Gravelly Hill Interchange (where it is fed by the Rea) and Bromford Viaduct, to Washwood Heath.

Skirting to the north of Castle Bromwich, it leaves Birmingham to the north-east at Park Hall Nature Reserve, passing Water Orton in Warwickshire. At Hams Hall, immediately after its confluence with the River Blythe and the little River Bourne, it turns sharply to take up a northward course, and soon feeds into the large complex of water purification lakes at Lea Marston that now make up Kingsbury Water Park. It then crosses into Staffordshire, flowing through Middleton Lakes RSPB reserve in a wide valley between Drayton Bassett to the west and Dosthill to the east. It then flows under Watling Street to the east of Fazeley, and under an aqueduct carrying the Coventry Canal. It continues northward to Tamworth, which takes its name from the river, where it is joined by the River Anker immediately to the east of Lady Bridge beneath the strategically positioned Tamworth Castle. The river continues its generally northward route past Hopwas, Comberford and Elford until it arrives at the National Memorial Arboretum where it forms the boundary between this and the Croxall Lakes Nature Reserve. After this, it flows under the railway at Wichnor Viaduct to its confluence with the Trent near Alrewas. The eventual outflow is into the North Sea, via the Humber Estuary. When the Tame and Trent meet, the Tame is the bigger river, the Trent effectively joining it as a tributary. However, the Trent being the longer river at that point is considered the more senior, and so the combined river bears its name.

The catchment of the Tame covers an area of nearly 1500 km² and contains a population of about 1.7 million people. Approximately 42% of the Tame basin is urbanised, making it the most heavily urbanised river basin in the United Kingdom.

The traditional industries of Birmingham and the Black Country, based on coal, iron and steel, were heavily polluting, and the Tame is conducted through a series of purification lakes below Lea Marston in Warwickshire to remove pollutants, an arrangement unique in the UK. A large part of this lake area forms the Kingsbury Water Park. Clean-up operations in a notoriously polluted stretch of the river in the Witton area of Birmingham have meant that aquatic wildfowl such as ducks and swans have settled on that stretch of the river. Sandwell Valley has evolved over the last two decades into an important urban wildlife habitat.

The Tame is non-navigable throughout its course.

Pollution
The Tame was once one of Britain's dirtiest rivers. It is now much cleaner, due to changes in legislation and the use of purification lakes at Lea Marston.

Flooding 

There have been major flooding problems associated with the river. These result largely from the mainly urban character of the upper catchment. Rainfall runs off the roofs and hard surfaces, raising river levels very rapidly. Rapid house-building and commercial development may have exacerbated the problem in recent years. Another development contributing to worse flooding has been the general rise in groundwater levels in the upper catchment area. As traditional industries have declined and been replaced by light industries and services, far less water has been taken from the river and the underlying aquifer.

The river is susceptible to spectacular flooding at the village of Hopwas, between Tamworth and Lichfield, during periods of heavy autumnal rain. The long-term persistence of the problem is attested by the Anglo-Saxon meaning of the village's name:- hop - nook of land, was - watery. There is also a substantial bend in the course of the river between Hopwas and Elford, giving rise to the name Tamhorn for the area.

Flood prevention 

Flood prevention work was carried out on Sandwell Valley in the 1980s. Forge Mill Lake was created as a stormwater retention basin by enlarging an existing depression. The river was dredged to deepen it and the gravel used to construct an island in the lake. This evolved into part of a nature reserve, at present leased to the Royal Society for the Protection of Birds. At about the same time, a similar arrangement was constructed at Sheepwash Urban Park, utilising old brickworks excavations as a storm water basin to relieve flooding by the Oldbury Arm.

In 2005, the river's alignment through Perry Hall Park in Perry Barr, Birmingham, just downstream of Sandwell Valley, was remodelled to slow the flow, alleviate flooding and create improved habitats for wildlife, as part of the SMURF (Sustainable Management of Urban Rivers and Floodplains) project.

Nonetheless, in June 2007, after heavy rain, the river burst its banks in the Witton area of Birmingham (just downstream of Perry Barr) and at Kingsbury Water Park.

In 2009, the Environment Agency held a public consultation on its proposed flood alleviation measures. Subsequently, the Environment Agency undertook £380,000-worth of improvements, mainly involving dredging and clearing of obstacles. 1000 tonnes of gravel were removed from around the Chester Road Bridge at Castle Vale and deposited further downstream to improve the fish spawning habitat. The Gravelly Hill section was relieved of 900 tonnes of silt and debris. The Oldbury Arm was cleared of debris and five weirs were removed from it to facilitate fish migration. Work under this programme continues into 2011, mainly around Water Orton.

Features

Tributaries

See tributary
River Anker
River Sence
Bourne Brook which joins the Tame at Fazeley
River Bourne which joins the Tame near Whitacre Junction 
River Blythe
River Cole
Crane Brook
Norton Brook
Footherley Brook
Little Hay Brook
Churchill Brook
Plants Brook
Hockley Brook
River Rea
Holbrook
River Tame, Willenhall or Wolverhampton Arm
Ford Brook
Sneyd Brook
Darlaston Brook
Waddens Brook
River Tame, Oldbury Arm

See also
Brookvale Park Lake
River Tame, Greater Manchester
Rivers of the United Kingdom
Tame Valley Canal
Witton Lakes

Further reading

References

External links

SMURF
Management of the Lower River Tame
Tame - Past, Present, Future

Rivers of the West Midlands (county)
Rivers of Staffordshire
Rivers of Warwickshire
 
Tributaries of the River Trent